Geyiksuyu is a village in the Tunceli District, Tunceli Province, Turkey. The village is populated by Kurds of the Kirgan tribe and had a population of 392 in 2021.

The hamlets of Alaca, Karaca and Korgun are attached to the village. A Gendarmerie Special Operations Battalion Command is located in the village.

References 

Villages in Tunceli District
Kurdish settlements in Tunceli Province